Radoslav Metodiev Zdravkov (born 30 July 1956) is a Bulgarian retired footballer who played as an attacking midfielder.

Club career
Zdravkov was born in Sofia. During his professional career, which spanned nearly 20 years, he represented Lokomotiv Sofia, CSKA Sofia, Portugal's G.D. Chaves, S.C. Braga, F.C. Paços de Ferreira and F.C. Felgueiras – after he had left the Iron Curtain at the age of 30 – FC Yantra and PFC Litex Lovech.

During his stay abroad he was known as Radi, and he was instrumental in lowly Chaves' first ever qualification to the UEFA Cup in the 1986–87 season, as fifth. From 1992 onwards he worked as a full-time manager, going on to be in charge of several clubs including PFC Spartak Varna on three occasions.

International career
Zdravkov earned 67 caps and scored ten goals for the Bulgarian national team during 13 years, and played at the 1986 FIFA World Cup finals.

References

External links

1956 births
Living people
Footballers from Sofia
Bulgarian footballers
Association football midfielders
First Professional Football League (Bulgaria) players
FC Lokomotiv 1929 Sofia players
PFC CSKA Sofia players
PFC Litex Lovech players
Primeira Liga players
Liga Portugal 2 players
Segunda Divisão players
G.D. Chaves players
S.C. Braga players
F.C. Paços de Ferreira players
F.C. Felgueiras players
Bulgaria international footballers
1986 FIFA World Cup players
Bulgarian expatriate footballers
Expatriate footballers in Portugal
Bulgarian expatriate sportspeople in Portugal
Bulgarian football managers
PFC Litex Lovech managers
FC Lokomotiv 1929 Sofia managers
PFC Slavia Sofia managers
PFC Lokomotiv Plovdiv managers
PFC Spartak Varna managers
PFC Cherno More Varna managers
PFC Beroe Stara Zagora managers